Alone or with Others is a Canadian docufiction film released in 1962. Co-directed by Denys Arcand, Denis Héroux and Stéphane Venne while they were students at the Université de Montréal, it was one of two Canadian films to be screened at the 1963 Cannes Film Festival.

The film centres on Nicole (Nicole Braun), a first-year university student who begins a romance with Pierre (Pierre Létourneau).

References

External links
 

1962 films
1962 drama films
Canadian docufiction films
Canadian black-and-white films
Films directed by Denys Arcand
Films directed by Denis Héroux
Canadian student films
1960s French-language films
French-language Canadian films
1960s Canadian films